Dayton Wendell Countryman (March 31, 1918 – September 13, 2011) was an American attorney, farmer, and politician who served as the 26th Attorney General of Iowa from 1955 to 1957.

Early life and education 
Born in Sioux City, Iowa, Countryman attended Pierson High School. He then received his bachelor's degree in forestry from Iowa State University in 1940. During World War II, Countryman served in the United States Army Air Forces as a pilot and was commissioned lieutenant colonel. He then graduated from the University of Iowa College of Law in 1948 and was admitted to the Iowa bar.

Career 
Countryman practiced law in Nevada, Iowa. From 1950 to 1954, Countryman served as attorney for Story County, Iowa as a member of the Republican party. From 1955 to 1957, Countryman served as Attorney General of Iowa. In 1956, 1960, and 1968, Countryman unsuccessfully sought the Republican nomination for United States Senate. He continued to practice law in Nevada, Iowa and also managed his farms.

Death 
Countryman died in Ames, Iowa from complications of Alzheimer's disease.

Notes

External links

1918 births
2011 deaths
Politicians from Sioux City, Iowa
People from Nevada, Iowa
Military personnel from Iowa
United States Army Air Forces pilots of World War II
Iowa State University alumni
University of Iowa College of Law alumni
Farmers from Iowa
Iowa lawyers
Iowa Republicans
Iowa Attorneys General
20th-century American lawyers
United States Army Air Forces officers